Canarium maculatum is a species of sea snail, a marine gastropod mollusk in the family Strombidae, the true conchs.

Description

Distribution
This marine species occurs off Hawaii

References

 Sowerby G.B. II , 1842 Thesaurus conchyliorum 1(1), p. 25-39
 Liverani V. (2014) The superfamily Stromboidea. Addenda and corrigenda. In: G.T. Poppe, K. Groh & C. Renker (eds), A conchological iconography. pp. 1-54, pls 131-164. Harxheim: Conchbooks. 

Strombidae
Gastropods described in 1842